Emerson Gomes de Moura, known simply as Memo  (born February 14, 1988 in Bonito), is a Brazilian professional footballer who plays as a defensive midfielder and center-back.

Career
Born in Bonito, Memo started his professional career with Pernambuco side Santa Cruz. He became an important part of manager Zé Teodoro's squad, and was named in the 2012 Campeonato Pernambucano selection. Memo scored a memorable goal for Santa Cruz in the 2012 Copa do Brasil first round as the club were eliminated by Penarol.

Portuguesa manager Candinho expressed an interest in signing Memo for their Série A campaign during June 2012.

In early 2013, Memo joined Ponte Preta on a loan deal. On 7 July, he moved to Oeste on loan after being surplus to Ponte Preta's requirements. At the end of the year, he returned to Santa Cruz. After a stint with Linense in Campeonato Paulista, he switched to Mogi Mirim on 8 August 2015. In the following year, he represented Itumbiara and América RN.

On 8 September 2016, Memo moved abroad and signed for Indian Super League franchise Delhi Dynamos FC. He made his debut in the following month, playing the whole ninety minutes in a 1–0 defeat against Atletico de Kolkata. On 27 December 2016, Memo returned to Brazil and signed with América (RN). However, he was released by the club on 17 April 2017, though he was allowed to train with the club. He subsequently signed with fourth tier club Fluminense de Feira Futebol Clube.

In August 2017, Memo returned to the Indian Super League, and signed for Jamshedpur FC.

On 4 October 2020 , Memo signed for Indian Super League club Chennaiyin FC.

Honours

Club
 Santa Cruz
 Pernambuco State League: 2011, 2012

References

External links
 Memo at playmakerstats.com (English version of ogol.com.br)
 
 
Memo at Indian Super League profile

1988 births
Living people
Brazilian footballers
Santa Cruz Futebol Clube players
Associação Atlética Ponte Preta players
América Futebol Clube (PE) players
Botafogo Futebol Clube (PB) players
Treze Futebol Clube players
Crato Esporte Clube players
Oeste Futebol Clube players
Mogi Mirim Esporte Clube players
Itumbiara Esporte Clube players
América Futebol Clube (RN) players
Odisha FC players
Fluminense de Feira Futebol Clube players
Jamshedpur FC players
Chennaiyin FC players
Indian Super League players
Brazilian expatriate footballers
Association football midfielders